Libya–South Africa relations refer to the current and historical relationship between Libya and South Africa.

Gaddafi regime

Apartheid regime
From the time Muammar Gaddafi assumed power in Libya in 1969 until the end of apartheid in South Africa and the country's first democratic elections in 1994 the Gaddafi regime was hostile to the government in Pretoria.  Libya provided funding and support to South African anti-apartheid movements. as well as military training to ANC combatants.  After the legalisation  of the ANC, then ANC leader Nelson Mandela visited Gaddafi in Libya in May 1990 to thank him for Libya's assistance.

ANC government
After South Africa's first democratic elections in April 1994 and the arrival of the new African National Congress (ANC) government South African - Libyan relations were transformed overnight from one of hostility to one of friendship and cooperation. This saw bilateral trade and investments increase greatly and South Africa making significant contributions to further negotiations for the release of the two Libyan suspects involved in the bombing of Pan Am Flight 103 over Lockerbie.

This relationship was highlighted by official visits to Libya by former President Mandela and former President Thabo Mbeki. Mandela made two official visits to the country as president of South Africa.  Once in 1994 shortly after being elected president and again in October 1997.  In June 2002 then President Mbeki led a South African delegation to Libya to discuss issues ranging from closer economic integration and bilateral trade to the launch of the African Union in Durban later that year.
 
In 1994 Gaddafi, then still a world pariah, was invited to attend then President Nelson Mandela's swearing in ceremony. Responding to Western criticism of the new ANC government's close relationship with the Gaddafi regime Mandela stated that: 

 
It is alleged that the Gaddafi government gave the ANC money for its election campaigns from 1994 until its fall in 2011. South Africa bestowed  the Order of Good Hope, one of its highest honours, on Gaddafi in 1997.

Libyan civil war

Despite backing U.N. Security Council resolution 1973 the official position of the South African government has been against the NATO bombing of Gaddafi forces and in support of the African Union's "road map to peace" which called for an immediate ceasefire, opening channels for humanitarian aid and talks between the rebels and government.

South Africa's Deputy Minister for Foreign affairs Ebrahim Ismail Ebrahim has stated that the way in which Resolution 1973 was implemented and the regime change policy of NATO has left the South African government feeling betrayed by the United Kingdom, France and the United States.  Ebrahim also stated that in the future this sense of betrayal might prevent South Africa from supporting other UN resolutions proposed by these countries.

The ANC lead South African government has been seen to be sympathetic to the Gaddafi government. One South African based analyst has identified six reasons for this: rejection of external involvement in African affairs especially by Western powers; regaining its 'radical credentials' that were lost for South Africa's support of resolution 1973; South African policy on the Israel-Palestine issue; a perceived shift of global power by the South African government that emerging powers will "cover South Africa's political back"; South Africa's policy of applying equal regional and international pressure to solve regional problems; and the ANC's reliance on Gaddafi money and investments in South Africa.

Post-Gaddafi Libya
In the early days of the National Transitional Council (NTC) rule, South Africa, closely flowing movements by the African Union, was slow to recognise it as the legitimate government of Libya, only recognising the NTC in late September 2011, almost a month after most Western nations (as well as Nigeria) and around two weeks after countries like China and Russia.

South Africa has been highly reluctant to unfreeze $1.5-billion in Libyan assets in South Africa.  The South African government has also urged the NTC to protect African migrants in Libya following reports of abuse by anti-Gaddafi militia units.

References

Additional Sources
McKaiser, Eusebius (August 21, 2011). SA's response to the Libyan crisis: An analysis, Politics Web, South Africa.

South Africa
Bilateral relations of South Africa